Ennio Preatoni (born 11 December 1944) is a retired Italian sprinter. He competed at the 1964, 1968 and 1972 Olympics and reached the final of the 4 × 100 m relay event in 1964, 1968 and 1972. Preatoni won an individual bronze and two relay gold medals at the Mediterranean Games.

Olympic results

National titles
 Italian Athletics Championships
 100 metres: 1968, 1970

See also
 Italy national relay team

References

External links
 

1944 births
Living people
Italian male sprinters
Olympic athletes of Italy
Athletes (track and field) at the 1964 Summer Olympics
Athletes (track and field) at the 1968 Summer Olympics
Athletes (track and field) at the 1972 Summer Olympics
European Athletics Championships medalists
Mediterranean Games gold medalists for Italy
Mediterranean Games bronze medalists for Italy
Athletes (track and field) at the 1967 Mediterranean Games
Athletes (track and field) at the 1971 Mediterranean Games
Mediterranean Games medalists in athletics
Universiade medalists in athletics (track and field)
Universiade gold medalists for Italy
Italian Athletics Championships winners
Medalists at the 1967 Summer Universiade